Glen Featherstone (born July 8, 1968) is a Canadian former professional ice hockey defenceman.

Biography
As a youth, Featherstone played in the 1981 Quebec International Pee-Wee Hockey Tournament with the Toronto Young Nationals minor ice hockey team.

Featherstone was drafted 73rd overall by the St. Louis Blues in the 1986 NHL Entry Draft and made his NHL debut playing for the Blues in 1988. He also played for the Boston Bruins, New York Rangers, Hartford Whalers and the Calgary Flames. In total, Featherstone played 384 regular season games, scoring 19 goals and 61 assists for 80 points and collecting 939 penalty minutes.

He left the NHL after the 1997 season to play in the International Hockey League, playing for the Indianapolis Ice and the Chicago Wolves.  After the league folded in 2001, Featherstone retired.

Career statistics

Regular season and playoffs

References

External links

1968 births
Living people
Boston Bruins players
Calgary Flames players
Canadian ice hockey defencemen
Chicago Wolves (IHL) players
Hartford Whalers players
Indianapolis Ice players
New York Rangers players
Peoria Rivermen (IHL) players
Providence Bruins players
Ice hockey people from Toronto
St. Louis Blues draft picks
St. Louis Blues players
Windsor Spitfires players